The Larned Wheat Kings were a minor league baseball team based in Larned, Kansas. From 1909 to 1911, Larned teams played exclusively as members of the Class D level Kansas State League, playing as the Larned Cowboys in 1909. In 1911, the Kansas State League, Larned included, folded during the season due to drought. Larned hosted home minor league games at City Park.

History
Minor league baseball in Larned, Kansas began during the 1909 season with the Larned Cowboys. On July 12, 1909, the Strong City-Cottonwood Falls Twin Cities team relocated and the Larned Cowboys became members of the reformed eight–team Class D level Kansas State League. Larned immediately joined the Arkansas City-Winfield Twins, Great Bend Millers, Hutchinson Salt Packers, Lyons Lions, McPherson Merry Macks, Newton Railroaders and Wellington Dukes as 1909 league members.

completing their first season of play, the Twin Cities/Cowboys team finished last. After compiling a 10–24 record while based in Larned, the team finished with a 32–65 overall record to finish in eighth place. Playing under managers Harry Freese and Farmer Weaver, the Cowboys finished 28.5 games behind the first place Lyons Lions in the final Kansas State League standings.

Continuing play as members of the 1910 Kansas State League, the Larned team played under the Larned "Wheat Kings" moniker. Larned finished the season with a record of 46–56 to place seventh under returning manager Farmer Weaver and Harry McLear. Weaver resigned with the team on an 11–game losing streak and a record of 15–25 at the time of his departure. The Wheat Kings finished 20.5 games behind the first place Hutchinson Salt Packers in the final 1910 standings.

On August 19, 1910, Harry Watson of Larned threw a no-hitter in a 2–0 victory over the Great Bend Millers.

The Larned use of the "Wheat Kings" nickname corresponds with local agriculture in the era. Today, the Larned area continues as a strong wheat producing region.

The 1911 Larned Wheat Kings played their final season as the Kansas League folded during the season. The Wheat Kings ended the 1911 season with a record of 23–32, after the league disbanded on July 11, 1911, due to crop failures and drought. When the league ceased play, Larned was in sixth place in the standings. Harry Berte served as manager as the Wheat Kings finished 14.0 games behind the first place Great Bend Millers in the shortened season.

After serving as an umpire in the 1911 Kansas State League, in 1912, former Larned manager Farmer Weaver was sentenced to 21 years in prison for domestic crimes. He was later released in 1914, with a former teammate serving as his parole clerk.

After the Kansas State League folded following the 1911 season, it resumed play in 1913 without a Larned franchise. Larned, Kansas has not hosted another minor league team.

The ballparks
The Larned minor league teams played home games at City Park in Larned. In the era of Sunday laws it was noted that Sunday baseball was allowed to be played in Larned, Kansas.

Timeline

Year–by–year records

Notable alumni

Lee Dressen (1910)
Walt Thomas (1910)
Farmer Weaver (1909–1910, MGR)

See also
Larned Cowboys playersLarned Wheat Kings players

References

Defunct minor league baseball teams
Defunct baseball teams in Kansas
Baseball teams disestablished in 1910
Baseball teams established in 1911
Kansas State League teams
Pawnee County, Kansas